The Madagascar men's national 3x3 team is a national basketball team of Madagascar, administered by the Fédération Malagasy de Basket-Ball.
It represents the country in international 3x3 (3 against 3) basketball competitions.

As of 2019, the head coach has been Jean de Dieu Randrianarivelo.

World Cup record

See also
Madagascar national basketball team
Madagascar women's national 3x3 team

References

Basketball in Madagascar
Basketball teams in Madagascar
Men's national 3x3 basketball teams
Basketball